Patrick Alphonse Bengondo (born 27 September 1981) is a former Cameroonian football player.

Bengondo began his career in his native Cameroon playing for Olympic Mvolyé. In 2000, he moved to Switzerland to play for Étoile Carouge FC where he played for the 2001–02 season before transferring to AC Bellinzona. Success there earned him a move to Romania to play for Universitatea Craiova. Injury limited his chances there and after only five appearances in the 2003–04 season he returned to Switzerland to play for GC Biaschesi for the 2004/05 season.

For the 2005/06 season Bengondo played in the 2nd tier of Swiss football the Swiss Challenge League for Winterthur. A return of 18 goals in 31 games earned him a move to Super League side FC Aarau. Bengondo failed to settle in his first spell at Stadion Brugglifeld and soon moved to Geneva to play for the once-great Servette. For the 2007/08 season Bengondo was again on the move – this time to play at FC Winterthur. For the 2008/09 season Bengondo made a return to Brugglifeld to play for FC Aarau.

In June 2011, Patrick went on trial with Scottish Premier League side Aberdeen. In Aberdeen's first pre-season friendly in advance of the 2011-12 season, which was against Scottish Second Division side Brechin City on 30 June 2011, he played as a trialist and scored Aberdeen's second goal in a 3–1 victory. Patrick spent time on trial in July 2011 with Benevento Calcio in Italy and Hastings United F.C. in England. Patrick eventually signed for FC Winterthur on 7 November 2011 and scored on his debut against Young Boys in the Swiss Cup on 27 November 2011.

References

External links

FC Aarau profile 
Swiss Football League profile 

1981 births
Living people
Cameroonian footballers
Cameroon international footballers
FC Aarau players
FC Winterthur players
Servette FC players
AC Bellinzona players
FC U Craiova 1948 players
Étoile Carouge FC players
FC Le Mont players
Liga I players
Swiss Super League players
Swiss Challenge League players
Expatriate footballers in Romania
Expatriate footballers in Switzerland
Cameroonian expatriate footballers
Cameroonian expatriate sportspeople in Romania
Cameroonian expatriate sportspeople in Switzerland
Association football forwards